PachiPara DL (DownLoad) Hyper Sea Story In Karibu (パチパラ DL（ダウンロード）ハイパー海INカリブ) is a downloadable game released on the Japanese PlayStation Store on July 2, 2008.

Gameplay
PachiPara DL Hyper Sea Story In Karibu is a pachinko simulator based on Sanyo's PachiPara series. The game includes three game modes; Sea Mode, Adventure Mode and Pirates Mode.

A Game Space has been released for the game in the Japanese version of PlayStation Home on February 25, 2010.

References

External links
 Official website

2008 video games
PlayStation 3-only games
PlayStation Network games
Video games developed in Japan
Japan-exclusive video games
PlayStation 3 games
PhyreEngine games
Irem games
Single-player video games